Ruth Quarshie is a Ghanaian model and the winner of the 2017 Miss Universe Ghana. She represented Ghana at the Miss Universe international contest in the United States and ended up as one of the top 16 finalists.

Education 
She is a graduate of the University of Ghana Business School.

References

Living people
University of Ghana alumni
Ghanaian female models
Year of birth missing (living people)
Miss Universe Ghana winners
Miss Universe 2017 contestants